In mathematics and theoretical physics, fusion rules are rules that determine the exact decomposition of the tensor product of two representations of a group into a direct sum of irreducible representations. The term is often used in the context of two-dimensional conformal field theory where the relevant group is generated by the Virasoro algebra, the relevant representations are the conformal families associated with a primary field and the tensor product is realized by operator product expansions. The fusion rules contain the information about the kind of families that appear on the right hand side of these OPEs, including the multiplicities.

More generally, integrable models in 2 dimensions which aren't conformal field theories are also described by fusion rules for their charges.

References 

Conformal field theory